The 2019–20 Florida Gators men's basketball team represented the University of Florida in the 2019–20 NCAA Division I men's basketball season. The Gators were led by fifth-year head coach Mike White and played their home games in the Exactech Arena at the Stephen C. O'Connell Center on the university's Gainesville, Florida campus as members of the Southeastern Conference. They finished the season 19–12, 11–7 in SEC play to finish in a tie for fourth place. They were set to take on Georgia in the second round of the SEC tournament. However, the SEC Tournament and all other postseason tournaments were cancelled amid the COVID-19 pandemic.

Previous season 
The Gators finished the 2018–19 season 20–16, 9–9 in SEC play to finish in eighth place. They defeated Arkansas in the second round, LSU in the quarterfinals before losing to Auburn in the semifinals of the SEC tournament. They received an at-large bid to the NCAA tournament where they defeated Nevada in the First Round before losing in the Second Round to Michigan.

Offseason

Departures

Incoming transfers

2019 recruiting class

Preseason

SEC media poll
The SEC media poll was released on October 15, 2019.

Preseason All-SEC teams
The Gators had two players selected to the preseason all-SEC teams.

SEC Player of the Year

Kerry Blackshear

First Team

Kerry Blackshear

Second Team

Andrew Nembhard

Roster

Schedule and results

|-
!colspan=12 style=| Exhibition

|-
!colspan=12 style=| Regular season

|-
!colspan=12 style=|SEC Tournament
|- style="background:#bbbbbb"
| style="text-align:center"|March 12, 20203:30 pm, SECN
| style="text-align:center"| (5)
| vs. (13) GeorgiaSecond round
| colspan=5 rowspan=1 style="text-align:center"|Cancelled due to the COVID-19 pandemic
| style="text-align:center"|Bridgestone ArenaNashville, TN
|-

Source

Rankings

*AP does not release post-NCAA Tournament rankings^Coaches did not release a poll this week.

References

Florida Gators men's basketball seasons
Florida